locate is a Unix utility which serves to find files on filesystems. It searches through a prebuilt database of files generated by the updatedb command or by a daemon and compressed using incremental encoding. It operates significantly faster than find, but requires regular updating of the database. This sacrifices overall efficiency (because of the regular interrogation of filesystems even when no user needs information) and absolute accuracy (since the database does not update in real time) for significant speed improvements, particularly on very large filesystems.

locate was first created in 1982.  The BSD and GNU Findutils versions derive from the original implementation.  Their primary database is world-readable, so the index is built as an unprivileged user. locate command is also included in MacOS.

mlocate (Merging Locate) and the earlier slocate (Secure Locate) use a restricted-access database, only showing filenames accessible to the user.

plocate uses posting lists. Like mlocate and slocate, it only shows files if find would list it. Compared to mlocate, it is much faster, and its index is smaller.

See also 
 mdfind related command in MacOS

References

External links 
 GNU Findutils
 mlocate
 
 
 

Variants:
 plocate - Variant faster than mlocate, with a smaller index.
 rlocate - Variant using kernel module and daemon for continuous updates.
 KwickFind - KDE GUI frontend for locate
 Locate32 for Windows - GPL'ed graphical Windows variant (no longer available)

GNU Project software
Unix file system-related software
Information retrieval systems